Progress City USA, located in Decatur, Illinois is an outdoor convention center and is a division of Richland Community College.  

The  facility was built as a semi-permanent home for the Farm Progress Show from 2005 to 2025.  Progress City USA hosts the Farm Progress Show during odd number years but is utilized as a site for a variety of outdoor events and conventions throughout the year.

See also
 List of convention centers in the United States

References

External links 
Progress City USA Page
Richland Community College Page

Convention centers in Illinois
Decatur, Illinois
Tourist attractions in Macon County, Illinois
Buildings and structures in Macon County, Illinois